Brian Patrick Ward (born May 22, 1973) is an American football coach and former player. He is the defensive coordinator at Arizona State University. Ward served as the head football coach at McPherson College in McPherson, Kansas from 2007 to 2009 and as the interim head football coach at Bowling Green State University for one game in 2015. As an assistant coach at Wabash College in 2002, he was named the AFCA Assistant Coach of the Year for NCAA Division III.

Coaching career
Ward was the head football coach at McPherson College in McPherson, Kansas for three seasons, from 2007 to 2009, compiling a record of was 17–14.

Ward was named the 2009 College Fanz National Coach of the Year after taking his team to the NAIA Football National Championship playoffs for the first time in the history of the program.

After the 2021 season, Ward was hired by new Washington State head coach, Jake Dickert, to be the teams defensive coordinator.

Head coaching record

Notes

References

External links
 Arizona State profile
 Nevada profile
 Syracuse profile
 Bowling Green profile
 Western Illinois profile
 North Dakota State profile

1973 births
Living people
Arizona State Sun Devils football coaches
Bowling Green Falcons football coaches
Drake Bulldogs football coaches
Glendale Gauchos football coaches
McPherson Bulldogs football coaches
McPherson Bulldogs football players
Missouri Southern Lions football coaches
Nevada Wolf Pack football coaches
North Dakota State Bison football coaches
Syracuse Orange football coaches
Washington State Cougars football coaches
Western Illinois Leathernecks football coaches
Wabash Little Giants football coaches
High school football coaches in Oklahoma
Sportspeople from Glendale, Arizona